Harold Mockford (born 1932) is a Sussex artist closely associated with the Towner Gallery in Eastbourne.  Mockford was born in the town and developed an early talent for art in preference to other subjects at school.  Later he attended evening classes at Eastbourne School of Art and continued with his painting while working as a dental technician.

Mockford has mainly worked in oils on board, and considers a painting complete when it has reached 'that perfect moment of strangeness', a state achieved by his distinctive technique.  He begins with flat plains of colour, leaving no area blank, then leaves the work face down on a blanket until he's ready to resume.  Then he incorporates the smudges, smears and textures to build up the scene which first inspired his imagination.

His subject is most often landscape, views of the South Downs and coast of the Eastbourne area or of the harbour at Newhaven where he has lived since 1996.  There are townscapes too, and intimate pictures of his studio and family, including a remarkable series recalling his father's illness and death.  The added strangeness of fading light has made evening a favorite time of day. Most of the paintings are in private hands but the Towner owns fourteen; others are in Brighton Museum and the Government Art Collection.

He married Margaret in 1954 and they have raised five children together.

With encouragement from the abstract painter and Towner curator William Gear, Mockford's career flourished in 1959 when he had his first solo show in Eastbourne and exhibited with the London Group of which Gear was a member.  A solo exhibition at the Thackeray Gallery in London followed, but Mockford was reluctant to commit himself to painting full-time and the self-promotion required to rely on art for a living.

Mockford illustrated a book of poetry by Pam Hughes and was chosen as a 'National Parks hero' for his paintings inspired by the South Downs. His 80th birthday in 2012 was celebrated by a major retrospective at the Towner Gallery.  Nineteen of Mockford's works are included in the BBC's Your Paintings collection.

References

External links 
 Towner Museum

 Harold Mockford

1932 births
Living people
20th-century English painters
English male painters
21st-century English painters
South Downs artists
20th-century English male artists
21st-century English male artists